Star Wars: The Secrets of the Sith is a Star Wars novel written by Marc Sumerak.

The book covers Sheev Palpatine's relationship with his master, Darth Plagueis, and the origin of Starkiller Base. The book is written from the perspective of Palpatine.

References 

Books based on Star Wars